Colton is a town in Whitman County, Washington, United States. The population was 418 at the 2010 census.

History
Colton was first settled in 1879 by J.A. Cole, and was founded in 1882 by J.B. Stanley.  Colton was incorporated in 1890 however it was not recorded until 1893.

Colton was a filming location for country artist Kenny Chesney in his 1995 hit song Me and You.

Notable natives
 Mike Kramer, former head football coach at Eastern Washington, Montana State, and Idaho State
 Albert Rooks, Captain of USS Houston (CA-30), posthumous Medal of Honor recipient
 Opal Irene Whiteley,  (December 11, 1897 – February 16, 1992) was an American nature writer.

Geography
Colton is located at  (46.5673, -117.1280).

Distances

Climate
This region experiences warm (but not hot) and dry summers, with no average monthly temperatures above 71.6 °F.  According to the Köppen Climate Classification system, Colton has a warm-summer Mediterranean climate, abbreviated "Csb" on climate maps.

Demographics

2010 census
As of the census of 2010, there were 418 people, 164 households, and 126 families living in the town. The racial makeup of the town was 95.5% White, 0.2% Native American, 0.7% Asian, 0.5% from other races, and 3.1% from two or more races. Hispanic or Latino of any race were 3.1% of the population.

There were 164 households, of which 33.5% had children under the age of 18 living with them, 68.9% were married couples living together, 6.7% had a female householder with no husband present, 1.2% had a male householder with no wife present, and 23.2% were non-families. 18.9% of all households were made up of individuals, and 6.1% had someone living alone who was 65 years of age or older. The average household size was 2.55 and the average family size was 2.91.

The median age in the town was 44.2 years. 26.1% of residents were under the age of 18; 5.3% were between the ages of 18 and 24; 19.9% were from 25 to 44; 33.3% were from 45 to 64; and 15.6% were 65 years of age or older. The gender makeup of the town was 51.0% male and 49.0% female.

2000 census
As of the census of 2000, there were 386 people, 148 households, and 108 families living in the town. The population density was 655.0 people per square mile (252.6/km2). There were 152 housing units at an average density of 257.9 per square mile (99.5/km2). The racial makeup of the town was 97.41% White, 1.04% Native American, 0.78% Asian, and 0.78% from two or more races. Hispanic or Latino of any race were 0.78% of the population.

There were 148 households, out of which 35.1% had children under the age of 18 living with them, 65.5% were married couples living together, 5.4% had a female householder with no husband present, and 26.4% were non-families. 24.3% of all households were made up of individuals, and 10.8% had someone living alone who was 65 years of age or older. The average household size was 2.61 and the average family size was 3.14.

In the town, the age distribution of the population shows 29.0% under the age of 18, 3.6% from 18 to 24, 28.2% from 25 to 44, 25.4% from 45 to 64, and 13.7% who were 65 years of age or older. The median age was 38 years. For every 100 females, there were 96.9 males. For every 100 females age 18 and over, there were 94.3 males.

The median income for a household in the town was $47,500, and the median income for a family was $56,875. Males had a median income of $38,125 versus $28,611 for females. The per capita income for the town was $21,506. About 3.5% of families and 2.7% of the population were below the poverty line, including 5.0% of those under age 18 and none of those age 65 or over.

References

Towns in Washington (state)
Towns in Whitman County, Washington
Populated places established in 1882